Clifford Coupland (29 May 1900 – 30 January 1969) was an English professional footballer who played as a defender.

References

1900 births
1969 deaths
Footballers from Grimsby
English footballers
Association football wing halves
Haycroft Rovers F.C. players
Grimsby Rovers F.C. players
Grimsby Town F.C. players
Mansfield Town F.C. players
Manchester City F.C. players
Caernarvon Athletic F.C. players
Sittingbourne F.C. players
Crystal Palace F.C. players
English Football League players